Éric Decroix (born 7 March 1969 in Croix) is a French former professional footballer who played as a defender.

Honours
 Coupe de France: 1998–99

References

External links
 
 
 Stats

1969 births
Living people
People from Croix, Nord
Sportspeople from Nord (French department)
Association football defenders
French footballers
Lille OSC players
FC Nantes players
Olympique de Marseille players
Montpellier HSC players
K.S.K. Beveren players
Ligue 1 players
Footballers from Hauts-de-France
Expatriate footballers in Belgium
French expatriate sportspeople in Belgium
French expatriate footballers